Dance with You may refer to:

"Dance with You" (Marcus & Martinus song), 2017
"Dance with You" (Solange Knowles song), 2002
"Dance with You (Nachna Tere Naal)", by the Rishi Rich Project, 2003
"Dance with You Tonight", 2017 song by Robert Plant from the album Carry Fire
"Dance with You", a song from the musical The Prom
"Dance with You, a 2020 song by Skusta Clee

See also
"Dance Without You", 2011 song by Skylar Grey